Plant (RUssian MOtors) is a company based in Nizhny Novgorod, Russia and established in 1874. 

The RUMO Diesel Plant manufactures large diesel engines for river cargo ship propulsion and diesel generator sets. It also manufactures reduction gears for cargo ships, integral-shaft diesel/gas compressors for pipeline boosting and for secondary oil extraction in petroleum fields, as well as metal products and household goods. Military orders were once 15 to 20 percent of total output, but have reportedly fallen to zero.

References

External links
 Official website

Manufacturing companies based in Nizhniy Novgorod
Diesel engine manufacturers
Marine engine manufacturers
Ministry of Heavy and Transport Machine-Building (Soviet Union)
Manufacturing companies of the Soviet Union
Engine manufacturers of Russia
Gas engine manufacturers
Electrical generation engine manufacturers